The 2016 Southern Conference baseball tournament was held from May 24 through 29 at Fluor Field at the West End in Greenville, South Carolina. Western Carolina University won the tournament. The annual event determines the conference champion of the Division I Southern Conference in college baseball.  The tournament winner earns the league's bid to the 2016 NCAA Division I baseball tournament.  This is the last of 20 athletic championships held by the conference in the 2015–16 academic year.

The tournament was originally held from 1950-53, when the Southern Conference was a large conference composed of several small schools and several large schools, the latter of which would form the Atlantic Coast Conference after the 1953 season.  The event was re-established in 1984 and has been held every year since.  Western Carolina has claimed nine championships, the most of any school, with The Citadel close behind at eight tournament wins.  Furman is the only other school current school with multiple championships, winning two.  East Tennessee State, UNC Greensboro, and VMI have never won a title, although East Tennessee State and VMI returned to the conference in 2015 after over ten years in other conferences.  Defending champion Mercer claimed the conference championship in its first ever appearance.

The tournament will be played in Greenville, which has hosted three of the past seven events.

Seeding and format
All nine teams will participate in the tournament, with the bottom two seeds playing a single-elimination play-in round.  The winner will play the top seed, as part of the double-elimination tournament.

Bracket

Play-In Round

Bracket

References

2016 Southern Conference baseball season
Southern Conference Baseball Tournament
SoCon baseball tournament
Southern Conference baseball tournament
Baseball competitions in Greenville, South Carolina
College baseball tournaments in South Carolina